Antoni Charles Sarcevic (born 13 March 1992) is an English professional footballer who plays as a midfielder for  club Stockport County.

After being released by Manchester City, Sarcevic began his senior career with Woodley Sports, where he spent only one season before joining Crewe Alexandra, but struggled to break into the first team and went on loan to Chester in 2010, before making a permanent transfer to them in the next year, but moved to League Two side Fleetwood Town in June 2013 for an undisclosed fee. He scored 15 league goals for Fleetwood in 2013–14, he also topped the Club's assist charts with nine, and was named in the League Two PFA Team of the Year after his performances for Fleetwood. In January 2017, Sarcevic joined Plymouth Argyle on a free transfer.

Club career
Born in Manchester, Sarcevic was in the youth system of boyhood club Manchester City aged seven to 15, before joining the youth system at Woodley Sports in 2008. He made his first team debut for Woodley in August 2009 and was offered a trial with Premier League club Blackburn Rovers during the 2009–10 season. Sarcevic was signed by League Two side Crewe Alexandra for an undisclosed fee in May 2010, on a one-year contract with an option to extend for a further year.

Chester
He was loaned out to Northern Premier League Division One North club Chester in October 2010. After two goals in seven appearances he was recalled to Crewe by Dario Gradi. Impressive in his loan spell, he scored on his Crewe debut on 1 February 2011, the last goal of a 6–2 defeat to Northampton Town. On 23 November 2011 he returned to Chester as a permanent signing. During his first two seasons with Chester, they were promoted twice to the Football Conference, in the process winning the Northern Premier League Premier Division, Peter Swales Shield, Conference North and Cheshire Senior Cup. After impressive performances for Chester Sarcevic reportedly attracted interest from football league clubs and won a call up to the England C.

Fleetwood Town
On 26 June 2013 Fleetwood Town signed Antoni Sarcevic for an undisclosed fee. He made his debut for the club  as Fleetwood Town beat Dagenham & Redbridge 3–1. On 23 November Sarcevic scored his first Football League hat-trick in the 5–4 home victory against Mansfield Town 5–4. His 15th goal of the season was a 75th-minute free-kick in the play-off final against Burton Albion on 26 May, which won promotion to League One.

Shrewsbury Town
At the end of his contract at Fleetwood, Sarcevic joined fellow League One side Shrewsbury Town on a free transfer in May 2016, signing a two-year deal. He left the club on 9 December 2016, by a mutual consent after agreeing to cancel his contract.

Plymouth Argyle
On 26 January 2017, Sarcevic joined League 2 side Plymouth Argyle on a free transfer. Sarcevic scored on his first start for Plymouth to earn them victory at Cambridge United on 4 February 2017. Due to his passion and consistent performances in the side he has earned the nickname 'Manchester Messi' from the green army.

Bolton Wanderers
On 15 July 2020, Sarcevic joined League Two side Bolton Wanderers, signing a two-year deal. On 29 August, the club announced that Sarcevic has been named club captain for the forthcoming season. He scored on his competitive debut on 5 September, scoring the equaliser in Bolton's first match of the season, a 1–2 home defeat against Bradford in the first round of the EFL Cup. "Sarce" (as he has been called in Bolton) led the team to a 4-1 victory over Crawley Town on 8 May  which secured promotion to Sky Bet League One for the 2021–22 season. After Bolton had a poor run of form in October 2021, Sarcevic was dropped to the bench. It was reported that this caused an argument with Manager Ian Evatt with both considering their relationship to be irreparable as a result. This apparently caused Sarcevic to accept a move to Stockport County.

Stockport County
On 22 October 2021, Sarcevic joined National League side Stockport County on a free transfer, with the midfielder signing a contract until 2024. Sarcevic made his league debut for the club a day later on 23 October, coming on as a second half substitute in a 2-1 loss against Notts County.

International career
Antoni was called up to England C for the first to face Bermuda in a friendly on 5 May 2013. He scored the first goal in the game.

Personal life
He is of Italian and Serbian descent.

Career statistics

Honours
Chester
Northern Premier League Premier Division: 2011–12
Conference North: 2012–13
Cheshire Senior Cup: 2012–13

Fleetwood Town
Football League Two play-offs: 2014

Stockport County
National League: 2021–22

Individual
PFA Team of the Year: 2013–14 League Two, 2019–20 League Two
Plymouth Argyle Player of the Year: 2019–20
EFL League Two Team of the Season: 2020–21

References

External links

1992 births
Living people
Footballers from Manchester
English footballers
England semi-pro international footballers
Association football midfielders
Manchester City F.C. players
Stockport Sports F.C. players
Crewe Alexandra F.C. players
Chester F.C. players
Fleetwood Town F.C. players
Shrewsbury Town F.C. players
Plymouth Argyle F.C. players
Bolton Wanderers F.C. players
Stockport County F.C. players
English Football League players
National League (English football) players
Northern Premier League players
English people of Italian descent
English people of Serbian descent